Dalbahadur Ranamagar (born 1961, date of death unknown) was a Nepalese boxer. He competed at the 1984 Summer Olympics and the 1988 Summer Olympics. At the 1988 Summer Olympics, he lost to Mohamed Hegazi of Egypt.

References

External links
 

1961 births
Year of death missing
Nepalese male boxers
Olympic boxers of Nepal
Boxers at the 1984 Summer Olympics
Boxers at the 1988 Summer Olympics
Place of birth missing
Asian Games medalists in boxing
Boxers at the 1982 Asian Games
Boxers at the 1986 Asian Games
Asian Games bronze medalists for Nepal
Medalists at the 1986 Asian Games
Lightweight boxers
20th-century Nepalese people